HCSD may refer to:
Hamburg Community School District (Iowa)
Hamilton City School District (Ohio)
Harbor Creek School District (Pennsylvania)
Harris County School District (Georgia)
Harrison Central School District (New York)
Harrison County School District (Mississippi)
Hillsborough City School District (California)
Hudson City School District; Hudson, New York 
Hudson City School District; Hudson, Ohio (Ohio)
Humboldt County School District (Nevada)